Xenohyus was an extinct genus of suids that existed during the Miocene in Europe.  

It showed many similarities to peccaries rather than modern pigs.

References
 

Prehistoric Suidae
Miocene mammals of Asia
Miocene even-toed ungulates
Prehistoric even-toed ungulate genera